The Ngäbe are an indigenous people of Panama and Costa Rica.

Ngabe may also refer to:

Ngabe District, a district of the Republic of the Congo
Ngäbe-Buglé Comarca, a comarca in Panama, home to the Ngäbe and others
Ngäbe, or Guaymí language, the language of the Ngäbe people